Colin "Col" Marius Greenwood (25 January 1936 – 3 October 1998) was a South African dual-code international rugby union and professional rugby league footballer who played in the 1960s, and coached rugby league in the 1960s.

Background
Col Greenwood was born in Cape Town, Western Cape, South Africa, and he died aged 62 in George, Western Cape, South Africa.

Playing career

International honours
Col Greenwood won a cap for South Africa (RU) while at Noordelikes (Northerns) against Ireland at Newlands Stadium, Cape Town on Saturday 13 May 1961, and won caps for South Africa (RL) while at Wakefield Trinity in 1963 against Australia (2 matches).

Challenge Cup Final appearances
Col Greenwood played , i.e. number 2, in Wakefield Trinity's 25–10 victory over Wigan in the 1963 Challenge Cup Final during the 1962–63 season at Wembley Stadium, London on Saturday 11 May 1963, in front of a crowd of 84,492.

County Cup Final appearances
Col Greenwood played  in Wakefield Trinity's 19-9 victory over Leeds in the 1961 Yorkshire County Cup Final during the 1961–62 season at Odsal Stadium, Bradford on Saturday 11 November 1961.

References

External links
SA Rugby League Springboks who toured Australia in 1963
Rugby League Final 1963
History of NNK Rugby Club

1936 births
1998 deaths
Canterbury-Bankstown Bulldogs players
Dual-code rugby internationals
North Sydney Bears coaches
North Sydney Bears players
Rugby league five-eighths
Rugby league locks
Sportspeople from Cape Town
Rugby league players from the Western Cape
Rugby league utility players
Rugby league wingers
Rugby League XIII players
Rugby union centres
Rugby union players from Cape Town
South Africa international rugby union players
South Africa national rugby league team players
South African rugby league players
South African rugby union players
Wakefield Trinity players